Wilfred "Wilf" Borden Schofield (19 July 1927, Brooklyn Corner, Kings County, Nova Scotia – 5 November 2008) was a Canadian botanist, specializing in mosses and liverworts. He was considered by many "the foremost bryologist in Canada".

Biography
Wilfred B. Schofield, who had two brothers and a sister, grew up in Nova Scotia. He received in 1950 a B.A. from Acadia University, where he was influenced by E. Chalmers Smith (1912–1992) and John S. Erskine (1900–1981). In 1951 Schofield obtained a Class A teacher's license from Nova Scotia Normal College. From 1951 to 1954 he was a high school geology teacher in Nova Scotia. He became in 1954 a graduate student at Stanford University, where he met Margaret "Peggy" Irene Bledsoe (1931–2005). In 1956 they both received their M.A.s (he in botany and she in music) and married in the autumn of that year. After their honeymoon, the newlyweds moved to Nova Scotia, where  Wilfred Schofield spent the winter teaching high school. The couple spent the summer of 1957 doing field work in the Yukon and then in the autumn moved to North Carolina, where he became a graduate student at Duke University. There he received his Ph.D. in 1960. His dissertation, written under the supervision of Henry J. Oosting, is entitled The Ecotone between Spruce Fir and Deciduous Forest in the Great Smoky Mountains. In the botany department of the University of British Columbia (UBC), Schofield became in 1960 an instructor and was eventually promoted to full professor, retiring in 1993.

From 1967 to 1969 he was the president of the Sullivant Moss Society, which was renamed in 1970 the American Bryological and Lichenological Society. For his textbook Introduction to Bryology (Macmillan, 1985), the Canadian Botanical Association awarded him the George Lawson Medal for 1986. In 1990 he was awarded an honorary D.Sc. by Acadia University.

He collected plants not only in Canada and the mainland USA, but also in Australia, New Zealand, Hawaii, Japan, and Taiwan. He did most of his field work in British Columbia, especially Haida Gwaii (formerly known as the Queen Charlotte Islands). In the last 15 years of his life, he spent summers collecting in the Aleutian Islands.

Schofield was predeceased by his wife. Upon his death he was survived by three daughters, and four grandchildren.

Eponymy

Genera
 (Cephaloziaceae) Schofieldia
 (Hylocomiaceae) Schofieldiella

Species
 (Andreaeaceae) Andreaea schofieldiana B.M.Murray
 (Symphyodontaceae) Chaetomitrium schofieldii B.Tan & H.Rob.
 (Hypnaceae) Ctenidium schofieldii H.Nishim.
 (Cladoniaceae) Cladonia schofieldii Ahti & Brodo
 (Plagiochilaceae) Plagiochila schofieldiana Inoue
 (Sphagnaceae) Sphagnum wilfii H.A.Crum
 (Plagiotheciaceae) Plagiothecium schofieldii G.J.Wolski & W.R.Buck

Selected publications

Articles
 
 
 
 
 
 
 
 
 
 
 
 
  2004

Books
  (1st edition, 1969)

References

External links
 
 

1927 births
2008 deaths
20th-century Canadian botanists
Bryologists
Plant collectors
Acadia University alumni
Nova Scotia Teachers College alumni
Stanford University alumni
Academic staff of the University of British Columbia
People from Kings County, Nova Scotia